A thesis (from Greek θέσις, from τίθημι tithemi, I put) is a formal academic work, also known as a dissertation.

Thesis may also refer to:

 Thesis statement, of a dissertation, essay, or other argumentative work
 Arsis and thesis, used to refer to the downbeat or accented part of a measure or declining part of a phrase

Organisations, brands and companies
 Thesis (representative body), a German academic organisation
 Thesis (typeface), a font superfamily designed by Lucas de Groot
 Lancia Thesis, an executive car by Lancia

Entertainment
 Tesis, a Spanish film
 Thesis (Jimmy Guiffre 3 album)
 Thesis (Matthew Shipp and Joe Morris album)
 The Thesis, album by The Ambassador

Mathematics and logic
 A conjecture, especially one too vague to be formally stated or verified but useful as a working convention
 A hypothesis, especially one too vague to be formally stated or verified but useful as a working convention
 A proposition

Humanities 
 In philosophy, the first stage of a dialectic, as in thesis, antithesis, synthesis

See also
 TESIS Aviation Enterprise, a cargo airline from Russia